The Università della Svizzera italiana (USI, literally University of Italian Switzerland), sometimes referred to as the University of Lugano in English-speaking contexts, is a public Swiss university established in 1995, with campuses in Lugano, Mendrisio and Bellinzona (Canton Ticino, Switzerland). USI is the only university in Switzerland where the official language is Italian, but many of its programs are in English. 

Five of the university's faculties (communication, culture and society; economics; informatics; theology and biomedical sciences) are located at the Lugano campus, while the Academy of Architecture is at the Mendrisio campus. Two affiliated institutions, the Institute for Research in Biomedicine and the Institute of Oncology Research, are located in Bellinzona.

In 2020, USI was ranked 273 in the 2020–2021 QS World University Rankings. In 2021, it climbed to rank 240. In other university rankings, USI ranked 54th in the 2020–2021 "Young University Rankings" of Times Higher Education World University Rankings, where universities with less than 50 years of activity are ranked.

Organisation and research areas 
USI is active in several studies and research areas: architecture, communication sciences, computational science, data science, economics, health studies, humanities, informatics, law, medicine, biomedicine. The university is organized in five Departments (Faculties), located on three campuses. The Faculties of Economics, of Communication, Culture and Society, of Informatics and of Biomedical Sciences are located on the Lugano campus, home also to the Facoltà di Teologia di Lugano, a private institution affiliated with the Diocese of the Catholic Church in Lugano. The Accademia di architettura is located on the Mendrisio campus. The affiliated Institute for Research in Biomedicine (IRB) and the Institute of Oncology Research (IOR) are both located in Bellinzona.

Architecture 

The Academy of Architecture, founded by acclaimed Swiss architect Mario Botta, is currently headed by Director Riccardo Blumer. With forty lecturers and twenty-five design studios (including Mario Botta, Massimo Carmassi, Valerio Olgiati), the Accademia di architettura trains an overall of 764 students for 3-year Bachelor and 2-year master's degrees (2013).

Economics 

The Faculty of Economics is headed by dean Gianluca Colombo. 856 students (2018). Main research and teaching topics include: Banking, Finance, Management, Economics and International Policies, Financial Communication, Marketing.

Communication, Culture and Society 

The Faculty of Communication, Culture and Society is headed by dean Luca M. Visconti. It is the third largest faculty of USI with 763 students enrolled in the autumn semester 2018-2019. Topics of research and teaching include Media, new media and journalism, Marketing, Corporate Communication, Public communication, Philosophy, Healthcare communication, Information and communication technologies, Education and Tourism. 

The faculty includes the Master program in Philosophy whose areas of research are mainly: Metaphysics, Philosophy of Science, Philosophy of Mind, Ancient Philosophy and Medieval Philosophy. It is directed by Kevin Mulligan and some of its teaching professors are Francesco Berto, Tim Crane, Paolo Crivelli, Katalin Farkas, Kit Fine, Kathrin Koslicki, John Marenbon, Anna Marmodoro, Tim Maudlin, Martine Nida-Rümelin, Pasquale Porro, Thomas Sattig, Peter Simons, Barry Smith and Achille Varzi.

Informatics 

The Faculty of Informatics was founded by Mehdi Jazayeri and established in 2004. The current dean is Professor Marc Langheinrich. It is ranked first in Europe for software engineering, according to CSrankings.

First year students cover mathematical topics, computer architecture, networking, and fundamental concepts of programming. A further course persists throughout the 3-year undergraduate curriculum.

Students are expected to learn about a wide variety of topics, from big O notation and calculus, through networking protocols and layers, to computer architecture. A variety of programming languages are used. Programming is introduced through Scheme and functional programming throughout the first semester, in parallel with the computer architecture course (which uses MIPS assembly). Later on, C, Java, and JavaScript are used. The curriculum puts a strong emphasis on teamwork, with a major group project happening at the end of every semester.

Master topics include Software Design, Software Architecture, Dependable Distributed Systems, Embedded System Design (see ALaRI), Artificial intelligence (the first AI Master in Switzerland, with IDSIA), Applied Informatics.

The Institute of Computational Science (ICS), a research unit of the Faculty, was founded in 2008 and is directed by Professor Rolf Krause. The Institute is the result of the vision of USI to become a new scientific and educational centre for Computational Science in Switzerland. The Institute offers research and teaching in Mathematical Modeling, Numerical Simulation, and High Performance Computing. The ICS hosts seven research groups which focus on advanced computing in computational science, high-performance methods for numerical simulation in science, medicine and engineering, computational time series analysis, computational shape analysis, multiscale and multiphysics models in computational biology, computational modeling of cardiac electrophysiology, and the simulation of biological and physical systems. With Michele Parrinello, one of the pioneers of the whole field of Computational science and co-developer of the widely used Car–Parrinello molecular dynamics method, is affiliated with the ICS. The Computational Science Master of Science graduate program at the ICS, directed by Olaf Schenk and Ernst Wit, emphasizes a mathematical and methodological framework as well as an application-oriented education in Informatics and Software Engineering.

Biomedical Sciences 

The Faculty of Biomedical Sciences at USI was established in 2014, with the purpose to make a contribution towards the solution of an important problem in Switzerland: the dearth of physicians trained in Switzerland. The current dean is Giovanni Pedrazzini. The new Faculty offers a master's degree in Medicine (3-year curriculum), starting in 2020, in close collaboration with ETH Zurich, University of Basel and University of Zurich on the academic side, and with the Ente Ospedaliero Cantonale (EOC) and private clinics in Ticino for bedside teaching.

Theology 
The university campus in Lugano is also home to the Faculty of Theology affiliated with USI. With the ratification by the Ticino government of the decision of their respective councils, the Faculty of Theology Lugano (FTL) will be academically integrated into Università della Svizzera italiana (USI). The FTL's proximity to USI - strengthened over the years through the sharing of training programmes, research and academic procedures - led to the decision to move closer on the institutional level as well, and foster further synergies in the future. Ticino State Council President Manuele Bertoli announced the affiliation at USI's XXV Dies academicus.

Affiliated and associated institutions 

 Dalle Molle Institute for Artificial Intelligence Research (IDSIA) was founded in 1988 by the private Dalle Molle foundation. Since 1995 it has been co-directed by acclaimed computer scientist Jürgen Schmidhuber. In 2000, IDSIA became a public research institute, affiliated to the Universita della Svizzera italiana and SUPSI in Ticino, Switzerland. Researchers from IDSIA teach, for example, courses in Artificial Intelligence and Robotics at the USI Master's degree level. USI's AI master program is directed by Luca Maria Gambardella.
 The Institute for Research in Biomedicine was founded in 2000 in Bellinzona with the goal of advancing the study of human immunology, with particular emphasis on the mechanisms of host defense. IRB is affiliated to USI since 2010.
 The Institute of Oncology Research, located in Bellinzona, is affiliated to USI as of January 1, 2017, following a University Council decision in 2015. IOR is the research unit of the Oncology Institute of Southern Switzerland which is part of the Ente Ospedaliero Cantonale of the Canton Ticino.
 IRSOL (Istituto Ricerche Solari Locarno) is a research institute in Locarno active in the field of solar physics. Its vanguard measuring instruments, the result of decades of evolution, allows for unique observations in the field of high precision solar spectropolarimetry. IRSOL is associated to USI since 2016.
 The Swiss National Supercomputing Centre is the national high-performance computing centre of Switzerland. It was founded in Manno, in 1991. In March 2012, the CSCS moved to its new location in Lugano-Cornaredo.
 In 2013 USI has been accredited a UNESCO chair in ICT to develop and promote sustainable tourism in World Heritage Sites. The UNESCO chair is committed to perform extensive research and teaching on how ICT, especially the internet, can be effectively exploited to develop and promote sustainable tourism at the World Heritage Sites (WHSs).
The Sasso Corbaro Foundation, established in 2000, is associated to USI since May 2019. Its activities aim at promoting training, research and expertise in the field of medical humanities. 
Established in 2008, the European School for Advanced Studies in Ophthalmology (ESASO) was officially associated to USI in February 2018, on the occasion of its 10th anniversary.

Academic programs 
USI adheres to the education system established with the Bologna Process, offering three-year undergraduate programmes (Bachelor) and two-year graduate programmes (Master). In addition, USI organises a selection of doctoral schools and, in the field of continuing education, a number of Executive Master programmes.

Bachelor study curricula are offered in five disciplines: Architecture, Communication Sciences, Economics, Informatics and Italian Language, Literature and Civilisation.

Twenty three Master study curricula are offered in fields of specialisation related to the research institutes of the USI Faculties: Architecture, Italian Literature, Finance, Management, Political Economics, Philosophy, International Policies, Health Communication and Management, Corporate Communication, Marketing, International Tourism, Financial Communication, Public Management, Computational Science, Embedded and Cyberphysical Systems, Artificial Intelligence, Software and Data Engineering, and Financial Technology and Computing.

Doctoral schools are at the heart of research conducted at USI and are offered in Finance, Communication Sciences, Philosophy, Informatics, Architecture, Economics, Immunology, Drug design, and Cancer Biology and Oncology

Notable faculty 

 Alex Alfieri
 Marco Baggiolini
 Pietro Balestra
 Mauro Baranzini
 Mario Botta
 Francesco Casetti
 Tim Crane
 Luigi Dadda 
 Marcel Danesi
 Martin J. Eppler
 Kit Fine
 Aurelio Galfetti
 Luca Maria Gambardella
 François Grin
 Kai Hormann
 Gilles Kepel
 Shane Legg
 John Marenbon
 Kevin Mulligan
 Valerio Olgiati
 Michele Parrinello
 Mauro Pezzè
 Olaf Schenk
 Jürgen Schmidhuber
 Boris Andreyevich Uspensky
 Peter Zumthor

Honorary degrees 
Università della Svizzera italiana confers, since 2003, honorary degrees to distinguished academics during its annual Dies academicus, including Robert F. Engle (Economics), Jimmy Wales (Communication Sciences), Barbara H. Liskov (Informatics), Mimmo Paladino (Architecture), and many others.

History

Higher-education initiatives in the 19th century 

The first plan for a public university in Ticino dates to the founding of the Canton, when in 1801 the Cantonal Diet decided for the establishment in Lugano of either a University or an Academy. The project of an Accademia Cantonale was further developed in the 1840s by Stefano Franscini. Although in 1844 the Grand Council approved with an overwhelming majority the bill to establish the institution, the Accademia was never established due to financial problems and more urgent issues with other sections of public education.

The public debate in the 1970s and 1980s 

The immediate predecessor to the current USI was the project that began in 1970 for an institute of higher-education focused on post-graduate continuing education and based on Regional Science and on the Humanities titled Centro Universitario della Svizzera Italiana (CUSI).

Carlo Speziali, then Councilor of State, was the main promoter of CUSI. However, although a bill about CUSI was passed by the Grand Council on 11 December 1985, a committee led by Augusto Bolla and UDC deputy Giovanni Maria Staffieri launched a referendum against it. The committee formed in favor of CUSI drew on the earlier legacy of Franscini, to demonstrate the historical necessity of higher-education in Ticino.

Despite the support that the project of CUSI had received by the Canton, on 20 April 1986 CUSI was turned down by the public vote: at a 41,5% turnout, voters rejected the bill with 47,011 votes, against 21,512 votes that went in favor of it. This controversial result was received by public institutions in Ticino as a threat to the hopes for the development of higher education outside of the German and French speaking regions.

Federal and cantonal initiatives of the 1990s 

Following the defeat of CUSI, several new groups and institutions at different levels of government and civil society began formulating alternative proposals for a university based in Ticino.

On 27 October 1990 Swiss Federal Councilor Flavio Cotti gave a speech in Poschiavo on multilingualism where he clearly supported the idea of a public university in the Italian-speaking Switzerland, this time however as a full-fledged institute of higher-education supported by a favorable economic growth. Cotti's speech echoed the manifesto that a group of politicians, scholars, and professionals published on 30 May 1990 on Libera Stampa, the newspaper of the Socialist Party. The group consisted of linguists Alessio Petralli and Stefano Vassere, economists Mauro Baranzini and Christian Marazzi, politician Rossano Bervini, Franco Cavalli, Mauro Martinoni, Silvano Toppi, Mauro Wolf.

At the Cantonal level, the Ticino Government appointed architect and scholar Pier Giorgio Gerosa as delegate for university problems. In the spring of 1990, from this institutional position and in a period of ongoing debates about the presence of multilingualism in the Swiss Federal Constitution, Gerosa asked the Swiss University Conference to contemplate the possibility of an academic institution in Italian-speaking Switzerland. Furthermore, beginning in December 1991 Gerosa drafted a series of reports to demonstrate the case for a university with as many as four departments.

At the Federal level, in 1992 the ETH Board commissioned architect Mario Botta to draft a project for a national academy of architecture, which however would not be approved. In response to this rejection, Botta brought the project to the attention of the Ticino Government, which reviewed it positively in May 1993. Consequentially this event brought about friction between the Government and Pier Giorgio Gerosa, which led eventually to Gerosa's dismissal.

Meanwhile, between 1992 and 1993 the Istituto Accademico di Teologia di Lugano was established under the support of Catholic Bishop Eugenio Corecco. Although private institutions of higher education were already present at that point in Ticino - one example of which was the English-speaking Franklin University Switzerland -  the initiative of the Catholic Church would be recognized as the first contribution towards a university in Italian-speaking Switzerland.

The opening of USI on October 21, 1996 

In the following years, the project for a university was further developed by dedicated parliamentary commissions. In 1994 a group of Mauro Baranzini, Sergio Cigada, and Lanfranco Senn drafted a project for the Departments of Economics and of Communication Sciences. In the same year the Council of State of the Canton Ticino approved dispatch n° 4308 pertaining the Bill for the Università della Svizzera italiana, which in twelve articles outlined the structure of the future institution, to be built around the Accademia di Architettura and with the contribution of private financing. A pivotal role in building consensus for this bill was played by Counselor of State Giuseppe Buffi. On Tuesday 3 October 1995, at 19:11, the Grand Council of Ticino approved the bill that established USI, with seventy-three of eighty favorable votes.

After twelve months of preparations, on 21 October 1996 USI opened its doors in Lugano and Mendrisio to the first class of students. Marco Baggiolini was appointed to serve as USI's first President. Mauro Dell'Ambrogio, who was the author of the bill, and who thus had previously played an important role on the side of Giuseppe Buffi - the Ticino Councilor of State at the head of the Dipartimento dell'Istruzione e della Cultura (Department of Education) - was appointed to serve as USI's first General Secretary. In 2000 USI granted its first degrees, concluding the first cycle of studies, thus meeting the acknowledgement of Federal authorities. In 2004 the Faculty of Informatics was established. In 2006, Marco Baggiolini was succeeded by Piero Martinoli. In 2014 the Government of the Canton Ticino approved the creation of the Faculty of Biomedical Sciences. In 2015, a new governance structure of USI was announced, with the position of President turned into a Rectorship. In 2016, Boas Erez was appointed Rector of USI, succeeding Piero Martinoli, and the new governance model was confirmed, including the appointment of two Pro-Rectors and the institution of an Academic Senate.

Rankings since 2020 
In June 2020, USI was included in the 2021 QS World University Rankings for the first time ever. USI was ranked 273° in the world. One year later, USI had climbed to rank 240.
Following Google Scholar, several USI professors have received more than 100,000 scientific citations and have an h-index greater than 100, for example, Michele Parrinello (Profile), Jürgen Schmidhuber (Profile), and Antonio Lanzavecchia (Profile).

Campus and student life 

The Lugano campus developed around the existing city hospital circa 1996. Several state-of-the-art buildings have been added, most notably Informatics (2007), Aula Magna, Aule, Library, and LAB.

The main building consists of four floors containing: Communications and Economics offices (1-3), the Executive Centre, four computer labs (1), classrooms (1-3), the cafeteria (2)(Q1-2007), and third-floor auditorium (3)(Q3-2007). The library is four floors tall. The LAB has 5 floors, in great part occupied by the Institute of Computational Sciences, and the rest by other Communication Sciences and Informatics departments.

 
The "Aule" building, informally known as Palazzo Rosso ("Red Building"), hosts six classrooms on each of its three floors, and is commonly used for Economics and Communication Sciences courses. The modern-looking concrete and metal Informatics building finished in 2007 contains classrooms (1), offices and study areas reserved for CS students and mentors (2-3).The Aula Magna is the university's convention hall and capable of seating around 400 people; it is used to host university conferences, speeches, and other public or private events; solely the entrance to the hall is visible above ground. South of the main building, the Central Services offices houses the Rectorate (as of September 1, 2016, until then the Presidency), the Institute for Italian Studies, and core units of the university such as the Media and Communication Service (press office), and the Research Service. Adjacent to the Rectorate building is the so-called "Blue building", formerly home to the Cantonal laboratory, and today occupied by a number of research institutes of the Faculty of Economics, with offices for faculty, PhD students, assistants, and related administrative staff.

Università della Svizzera italiana has 4190 students in 2022-2023; of these 33% are Swiss, and 67% are foreign.

Off-campus, students participate in city-sponsored tourism events, school-sponsored sporting activities, and student associations, despite the town's small population. Around twenty student associations have been established, with student clubs oriented around economics (AIESEC), informatics (EESTEC, IEEE student branch), and communications (L'universo student newspaper).

List of rectors

See also 
 List of largest universities by enrollment in Switzerland

Notes and references

External links 

USI Università della Svizzera italiana
 USI Photo Galleries
 Information about Università della Svizzera italiana
 European Journalism Observatory

 01
Svizzera italiana
Schools in the canton of Ticino
Educational institutions established in 1996
1996 establishments in Switzerland
Universities established in the 1990s